Several software products and services are called Data Explorer:
 Azure Data Explorer
 Exoplanet Data Explorer
 Google Public Data Explorer
 Human Olfactory Data Explorer
 IBM OpenDX
 UNEP Environmental Data Explorer

Other uses:
 Data Explorers, a company